Eulace Peacock (August 27, 1914 – December 13, 1996) was an American track and field athlete in the 1930s.

Peacock was born in Dothan, Alabama and raised in the Vauxhall section of Union Township, New Jersey, where he graduated from Union High School in 1933. He set the New Jersey high school record in 1933 with a long jump of  that was on the books for 44 years until Renaldo Nehemiah jumped  

He became a rival to Jesse Owens in many sprinting competitions. He broke the high school record in the long jump the same day it was bettered by Owens. "I had that record for two hours." He attended Temple University in Philadelphia where he became a member of Alpha Phi Alpha fraternity. Peacock won the Amateur Athletic Union (AAU) outdoor pentathlon championship six times, in 1934, 1935, 1937, and from 1943 through 1945.

He was a sprinting prodigy, who bested the notable prodigy of his time, Owens, on several occasions. A victory by Peacock over Owens in a July 1935 meet in Lincoln, Nebraska led The New York Times to say that "Peacock's star still is in the ascendancy" under the headline "Peacock's Victories Over Owens Project Duel for Olympic Fame" After pulling a hamstring muscle, he was unable to qualify for the 1936 Summer Olympics in Berlin, Germany.

In 1942 he served in the United States Coast Guard; in later years he opened a liquor store and a car-rental business. He stayed connected with athletics by officiating at championship events and Olympic qualifying trials.  He has been honored by a number of athletic bodies, including the National Track and Field Hall of Fame.

Peacock died of Alzheimer's disease at age 82 in Yonkers, New York and was interred in Kensico Cemetery in Valhalla, NY.

References

External links
 N.Y. Times Article on Eulace Peacock
 Full Biography of Eulace Peacock
 New York Times Obituary for Eulace Peacock
 

1914 births
1996 deaths
Manhattan Beach Coast Guard Depth Bombers football players
American male sprinters
Temple University alumni
Sportspeople from Dothan, Alabama
Burials at Kensico Cemetery
Deaths from dementia in New York (state)
Deaths from Alzheimer's disease
USA Outdoor Track and Field Championships winners
People from Union Township, Union County, New Jersey
Sportspeople from Union County, New Jersey
Union High School (New Jersey) alumni
United States Coast Guard personnel of World War II